Fredrik Carlsen (born 1 December 1989) is a Norwegian football midfielder who currently plays for Aalesunds FK in the Norwegian Premier League.

He was under contract with Vålerenga Fotball, but was loaned to Aalesund for the 2009 season. This loan was extended for the 2010 season after the clubs couldn't agree a transfer price.

He was sent off during AaFK's first ever cup final in 2009 which the club still went on to win.

Career statistics

References

External links
Profile at Aalesunds FK official page

1985 births
Living people
Norwegian footballers
Vålerenga Fotball players
Aalesunds FK players
Eliteserien players

Association football midfielders
Footballers from Oslo